Mocana (founded 2002) is a San Jose-based company that focuses on and embedded system security for industrial control systems and the Internet of Things (IoT). One of its main products, the IoT Security Platform, is a high-performance, ultra-optimized, OS-independent, high-assurance security platform that is intended to support all device classes. This decoupling of the security implementation from the rest of application development allows for easier development of software for devices comprising the "Internet of Things", in which numerous independent networked devices communicate with each other in various ways. Mocana was originally launched as an embedded systems security company, but as of the early 2010s, the company has shifted its focus to protecting mobile devices and the apps and data on them.

History 
Mocana introduced its products in 2004 with a focus on embedded systems security. That same year the company launched Embedded Security Suite, a software product to secure communications between networked devices. In February 2005, while based in Menlo Park, California, the company joined the Freescale Semiconductor Developers Alliance Program, and delivered that group's first security software. In 2008, Mocana was cited as an example of how an independent company could provide security for smartphones.

Mocana CEO Adrian Turner published an article in the San Jose Mercury News on the risks associated with non-PC networked devices; and the New York Times reported that Mocana's researchers had "discovered they could hack into a best-selling Internet-ready HDTV model with unsettling ease," and highlighted the opportunity for criminals to intercept information like credit card billing details. Media outlets across the U.S. cited this point in their coverage of the risks associated with advances in technology.

Mocana sponsored the 7th Workshop on RFID Security and Privacy at the University of Massachusetts in 2011. It launched the Mobile Application Protection platform in 2011 with support for Android apps, and added iOS app support in 2012. Following a Series D funding round in 2012, total investment in Mocana was $47 million.

New CEO James Isaacs replaced Turner in September 2013. Interim CEO Peter Graham replaced Isaacs in April 2016.

In April 2016, Mocana spun off its mobile security business to Blue Cedar Networks. William Diotte replaced Graham as CEO in May 2016.

Mocana was originally based in San Francisco but moved to Sunnyvale in December 2017 and later to San Jose.

The company was acquired by DigiCert in January 2022.

Products and services 
Mocana's IoT Security Platform is a security software suite for embedded systems. The software provides the cryptographic controls (e.g. authentication, confidentiality, encryption, and device and data integrity verification) for embedded devices and applications.

The company also offers customizable user agreements and optional FIPS 140-2 validated cryptographic engines. Access to application source code is not required. The product's design is based in the assumption that many assurances of security from the device and its operating system may be compromised. This obviates the necessity of having "infallible" system-wide security policies.

In addition, Mocana offers consulting services, evaluating and advising on security threats in networked devices.

Industries served 
Mocana's security technology is used in airplane in-flight entertainment systems, medical devices, battlefield communications, automobile firmware, and cell phone carrier networks. Mocana senior analyst Robert Vamosi was cited in a 2011 piece in Bloomberg Businessweek comparing tech companies' approaches to security.

Funding 
Mocana's investors include Trident Capital (2012), Intel Capital (2011), Shasta Ventures, Southern Cross Venture Partners, and Symantec (2010). As of the August 2012 Series D, a total of $47 million has been raised.

Awards, recognition, and accomplishments 
 Recognized by Frost & Sullivan as the leading IoT security platform for industrial manufacturing and automation in 2017
 Mocana named most innovative security company by Leading Lights in 2017
 Named as to the OnDemand 100 in 2013.
 Recognized by the World Economic Forum as a 2012 Technology Pioneer
 Named to the "Red Herring Global 100" in 2008.

Authored by Mocana personnel 
 Mocana senior analyst Robert Vamosi published the book "When Gadgets Betray Us: The Dark Side of Convenience" in 2011.
 Mocana CEO Adrian Turner published the book Blue Sky Mining in 2012.
 Mocana engineer Dnyanesh Khatavkar presented the paper Quantizing the throughput reduction of IPSec with mobile IP at the 2002 (45th) Midwest Symposium on Circuits and Systems, an IEEE conference.

References 

Software companies based in the San Francisco Bay Area
Computer security companies
2002 establishments in California
Companies based in San Francisco
Defunct software companies of the United States
Companies based in Sunnyvale, California